James Loren Martin (September 13, 1846 – January 14, 1915) was a Vermont lawyer, politician, and United States federal judge. The notable positions in which he served during his career included State's Attorney of Windham County, Speaker of the Vermont House of Representatives, United States Attorney for the District of Vermont, and United States District Judge of the United States District Court for the District of Vermont.

Early life
Martin was born in Landgrove, Vermont. The son of James and Lucy (Gray) Martin, he began paying for his own tuition at age 14 by working in a chair factory, producing maple sugar, and clearing land. His education included the schools of Landgrove and the academies of Londonderry, Vermont and Marlow, New Hampshire. He taught school in Londonderry and Winhall, Vermont, and studied law with Hoyt Henry Wheeler before attending Albany Law School, from which he graduated with a Bachelor of Laws in 1869. He practiced law, first in Londonderry, and later in Brattleboro, Vermont.

Career
A Republican, he was State's Attorney for Windham County, Vermont from 1876 to 1877. He served in the Vermont House of Representatives from 1874 to 1882 (from Londonderry) and 1892 (from Brattleboro). From 1878 to 1882, he was Speaker of the House.

Martin was state tax commissioner in 1888, 1890 to 1892, and 1894. He served as United States Attorney for the District of Vermont beginning in 1898, succeeding John H. Senter. He served until 1906, and was succeeded by Alexander Dunnett.

Martin was a longtime member of Brattleboro's school board, and served on the board of directors of several corporations, including Vermont Mutual Fire Insurance, American Fidelity Company, National Life Insurance Company, and the Holden & Martin lumber company.

Federal judicial service
On October 20, 1906, Martin received a recess appointment to the United States District Court for the District of Vermont from President Theodore Roosevelt, filling the position vacated by Judge Hoyt Henry Wheeler. Formally nominated to the same position by President Roosevelt on December 3, 1906, he was confirmed by the United States Senate on December 11, 1906, and received his commission the same day.

Death and burial
Martin remained on the court until his death. He died at the train station in Montpelier, Vermont after suffering a heart attack on January 14, 1915. He was buried at Morningside Cemetery in Brattleboro.

Honors
Martin received an honorary Master of Arts degree from Dartmouth College in 1882. In 1914, he received an honorary LL.D. from Middlebury College.

Family
In 1869, Martin married Delia E. Howard, who died in 1881. They were the parents of three children—Jimmie (1873-1880), an unnamed son who was born and died in 1877, and Delia (1881-1882). In 1884, he married Jessie Lillie Dewey. They were the parents of three daughters—Margaret, Helen, and Katharine.

References

Sources

Books

Newspapers

Magazines

External sources
 
 Catalogue of Officers and Students of Middlebury College, 1917
 General Catalogue of Dartmouth College and the Associated Schools 1769-1900, 1900

1846 births
1915 deaths
People from Landgrove, Vermont
Republican Party members of the Vermont House of Representatives
Speakers of the Vermont House of Representatives
Vermont lawyers
State's attorneys in Vermont
Judges of the United States District Court for the District of Vermont
United States district court judges appointed by Theodore Roosevelt
20th-century American judges
United States Attorneys for the District of Vermont
People from Brattleboro, Vermont
Albany Law School alumni
Burials in Vermont
19th-century American politicians
19th-century American judges